Gateways may refer to:

Art and entertainment
Gateways (novel), the seventh volume of the Repairman Jack books by F. Paul Wilson
Gateways (Star Trek), a 2001 crossover novel series 
Gateways (video game), a 2012 action-adventure platformer
"Gateways", a song by Dimmu Borgir from Abrahadabra

Organizations
Gateways (organization), an American Orthodox Judaism outreach organization
Gateways club, a lesbian nightclub in Chelsea, London, England
Gateways High School, a public high school in Springfield, Oregon, United States
Gateways School, an independent school in Leeds, West Yorkshire, England

See also
Gateway (disambiguation)
The Gateway (disambiguation)